The Fimbul Ice Shelf is an Antarctic ice shelf about  long and  wide, nourished by Jutulstraumen Glacier, bordering the coast of Queen Maud Land from 3°W to 3°E. It was photographed from the air by the Third German Antarctic Expedition (1938–1939), mapped by Norwegian cartographers from surveys and air photos by the Norwegian–British–Swedish Antarctic Expedition (1949–1952) and from air photos by the Norwegian expedition (1958–1959) and named Fimbulisen (the giant ice).

References

External links 
 Fimbul Ice Shelf – top to bottom
 Numerical simulations of the ice flow dynamics of Fimbulisen 

Ice shelves of Queen Maud Land
Princess Martha Coast